FBIS may refer to:
Foreign Broadcast Information Service
 Fellow of the British Interplanetary Society

See also
 The FBIs